Hugo Busso Peus (17 September 1839 – 2 December 1893) was a German jurist and politician.

Life 

Peus, son of Hugo Peus, father of Friedrich-Carl Peus and grandfather of the two cousins politician Busso Peus and numismatist Busso Peus (24 October 1902 – 18 November 1983), studied law at Humboldt University of Berlin and at the Catholic University of Leuven, Belgium, and—succeeding his father—became a solicitor and barrister.

In 1879, he moved his law office to Münster, the capital of Westphalia at the time. Thereupon, he served as a notary as well. In 1890, he was appointed Royal Legal Counsel (Königlich Preußischer Justizrat) by Wilhelm II., the King of Prussia.

Peus was a member of the Catholic Centre Party and at the front line in the political struggle known as the Kulturkampf. In 1891, after the Party's chairman Ludwig Windthorst had died, Peus was offered by the Centre Party to take over Windthorst's seat in the Imperial Parliament in Berlin—an offer Peus declined as being incompatible with running his law office in Münster.

References

Further reading 
 Thomas Daffner: Die Geschichte der Zentrumspartei und ihre Position im Kaiserreich, GRIN Publishers, 2007, 
 Preussisches Staatsministerium: Handbuch über den Königlich Preussischen Hof und Staat, 

Jurists from North Rhine-Westphalia
German politicians
1839 births
1893 deaths
People from Münster